Dundee railway station serves the city of Dundee on the east coast of Scotland. Dundee is the tenth busiest station in Scotland. In January 2014, the former main station building was demolished to make way for a new building as part of the Dundee Waterfront Project which opened on 9 July 2018.

Dundee railway station is where the Edinburgh–Dundee line meets the Glasgow–Dundee line, via Perth. It is also the start of the Dundee to Aberdeen line.

History 
The station is the rebuilt Dundee Tay Bridge railway station, which had been built by the North British Railway in 1878 as part of the Tay Rail Bridge project. It was originally one of three main stations in Dundee, along with Dundee West station, the Caledonian Railway station for Perth which was rebuilt in 1889-1890 and closed in the 1960s, and Dundee East station on the Dundee and Arbroath Joint Railway which closed in 1959.  It is located in cutting at the south end of Camperdown tunnel, which passes beneath the town's former docks (now filled in) and required permanent pumping to keep dry. The station is consequently sited below sea level.

In the nineteenth century plans were put forward to concentrate all Dundee's railway facilities in a new central station, with the idea first being mooted by John Leng in 1864 in his role as editor of the Dundee Advertiser.  The idea re-emerged in 1872 following the start of work on the Tay Rail Bridge and again in 1896.  Various sites for the scheme were suggested including building it between the High Street and the harbour and between the Murraygate and the Meadows. However none of these proposals were ever realised and the three distinct stations survived as independent entities.

Both  and  stations are located very close to the city's boundaries, but lie in Angus and Perth and Kinross.

As part of the redevelopment of Dundee city centre in the 1960s the original public entrance of Dundee Tay Bridge station was demolished to accommodate the new Tay Road Bridge offramps, with a new smaller structure replacing it. A footbridge connected the new station building to the city's Union Street to allow pedestrians to cross the busy inner ring road safely. In 2005, the footbridge was demolished in two phases as part of a regeneration project called the Dundee Central Waterfront Development Plan. This project, which has included removal of the 1970s public entrance to the station, will attempt to restructure the approach roads to the Tay Road Bridge and create a new civic space, as well as making way for the new railway station.

New station 
A new £38m railway station was built in 2018; it replaced the old station as part of the Dundee waterfront regeneration project. The designer of the station was Dundee-based architecture firm Nicoll Russell Studios in collaboration with Jacobs Engineering Group; construction work was carried out by Balfour Beatty. Construction began in late 2015 and a temporary entrance was established on Riverside Drive. The new station was built over the site of the demolished old station. It includes a five-story curved building that houses the new station entrance, concourse and access points on the first and underground floors as well as a 120-room Sleeperz Hotel occupying the upper floors.

The new railway station completed construction in early June and opened alongside the new Sleeperz Hotel on 9 July 2018 by Dundee West MSP & then Minister for Public Health and Sport Joe FitzPatrick, Lord Provost Ian Borthwick and representatives from Dundee City Council.

Facilities 
There is a taxi stand immediately outside of the station building, and the main bus interchange is ½-mile walk from the station in the city centre. There is a "Travel Office" for information and ticket purchasing, as well as an automatic ticket machine outside the office. The office often closes well before the last trains have departed.

There is also a café adjacent to the automatic ticket gates on the concourse. The café, operated by WHSmith, mainly serves cold food such as sandwiches and hot and cold drinks. Like the ticket office, the café does not open in the late evening. A Costa Coffee branch opened in 2020, located in the former Tay Bar.

A Tesco Express opened next to the entrance of the station in 2022.

Platform layout 
The station is based on an island platform, with two through platforms on the outer sides, and two west-facing bay platforms:

 Platform 1 is the westbound through platform. It is used for trains from Arbroath and Aberdeen to Glasgow Queen Street and Edinburgh Waverley.
 Platform 2 and 3 are the bay platforms, used for terminating trains from Edinburgh and Glasgow.
 Platform 4 is the eastbound through platform, used for trains towards Arbroath and Aberdeen.

Passenger volume 

The statistics cover twelve month periods that start in April.

Services 

Off-peak services that operate from the station are:

Footnotes

References

Bibliography

External links

Video footage of Dundee railway station

Railway stations in Dundee
Former North British Railway stations
Railway stations in Great Britain opened in 1878
Railway stations served by ScotRail
Railway stations served by Caledonian Sleeper
Railway stations served by CrossCountry
Railway stations served by London North Eastern Railway